Shustovo is a rural locality (a village) in Moshokskoye Rural Settlement, Sudogodsky District, Vladimir Oblast, Russia. The population was 84 as of 2010.

Geography 
Shustovo is located on the Kostyanka River, 41 km southeast of Sudogda (the district's administrative centre) by road. Gonobilovo is the nearest rural locality.

References 

Rural localities in Sudogodsky District